Darken may refer to:

 Darken Rahl, a fictional character from Terry Goodkind's The Sword of Truth series
 Lawrence Stamper Darken (1909–1978), American physical chemist and metallurgist
Darken's equations of chemical thermodynamics
 Rob Darken (born 1969), Polish heavy metal musician
 Eric Darken, American percussionist, composer, and programmer
 Darken, a 2017 Canadian film

See also 
 Dark (disambiguation)
 Darkening (disambiguation)
 Darker (disambiguation)
 Darkness (disambiguation)